Solar power in Bulgaria has expanded by 100 megawatts (MW) in 2011. A 16.2 MW solar power plant in Zdravetz, Bulgaria was expected to be completed in June 2012, with power being sold for $0.30/kWh in a fixed rate 20 year power purchase agreement.

Since then, however, new installations have nearly come to a halt with only about 12 MW of additional capacity installed during 2013 and 2014.

See also

 Solar power
 Solar power by country
 Solar power in the European Union
 Growth of photovoltaics
 Wind power in Bulgaria
 Hydroelectricity in Bulgaria
 Renewable energy by country

References

 
Electric power in Bulgaria